133rd Engineer Battalion

The 133rd Engineer Battalion is a component of the Maine Army National Guard and the United States Army. The organisation is the oldest in the Maine Guard and is one of the largest organisations in the state. The battalion has responded to natural disasters at home and taken military actions overseas. The current battalion has the capacity to execute a variety of Army Engineer missions, from horizontal construction, vertical construction, combat engineer missions, and surveying. The battalion has two horizontal companies, one vertical company, one combat engineer company, a forward support company, a survey and design detachment, and a headquarters company.

History 
Note - The primary source for the historical information below is the Lineage and honour of the 133rd Engineer Battalion from the U.S. Army Center for Military History.)

The 133rd Engineer Battalion is the oldest unit in the Maine Army National Guard and one of several National Guard units with campaign credit for the American Revolution and the War of 1812.

Known as “Maine’s Regiment”, the 133rd traces its beginnings back to the formation of the Cumberland County Regiment of the Massachusetts Militia in 1760 and its subordinate element, the Portland Light Infantry in 1804. The Portland Light Infantry manned the defences around Portland, such as Forts Preble and Scammell, to prevent British attack in 1814 during the War of 1812. Other militia units flooded Portland that year, responding to a British invasion from the north that had seized Bangor and Castine. Veterans of the Napoleonic Wars, the British were tough and determined fighters. The British government had taken control of Maine and turn it into a colony called “New Ireland.” Several thousand British soldiers assembled in Castine with seven ships of the line, intent on taking Portland in 1814. However, militia units from all over Maine put up such a strong defense that after a few skirmishes on the outskirts of town, the British decided that an attack would be too costly and cancelled the invasion.

Civil War
Maine men would be called on again in 1861 when war divided the nation into North and South. The Portland Light Infantry was designated as Company A of the 1st Maine Volunteer Infantry Regiment, a 90-day regiment, and marched off to Virginia but was not engaged in the Battle of Bull Run. The 1st Maine was mustered out of service on August 5, 1861.

Many members of the 1st Maine Volunteer Infantry reenlisted as members of the 10th Maine Volunteer Infantry Regiment when it was formed in October 1861. It fought at the battles of Cedar Mountain and Antietam in 1862. Most enlistments in the 10th Maine expired on May 8, 1863, except for 3 companies of "three year men" who were retained in service as the 10th Maine Battalion. The 10th Maine Battalion served as the Provost Guard for the Army of the Potomac at the Battle of Gettysburg. The 29th Maine Volunteer Infantry Regiment was mustered into service on December 17, 1863, and was transferred to the southern theater, fighting in Louisiana in the Red River Campaign from March to May 1864, and then in Virginia from July 1864 to April 1865. On 29 May 1864, the 10th Maine Battalion was consolidated with the 29th Maine, thus establishing continuity with the 10th Maine Regiment and the 1st Maine Regiment. The 29th Maine served on occupation duty in South Carolina starting in June 1865 and was mustered out of service on June 21, 1866.

The 2nd Maine Volunteer Infantry Regiment was called into service at the same time as the 1st and saw action during the Seven Days Battles, 2nd Bull Run, Antietam, Fredericksburg, and Chancellorsville. The regiment's enlistments ran up in 1863, but about half the unit had signed papers to serve for the three years, so they were amalgamated into the 20th Maine Volunteer Infantry Regiment.
Also in 1862, the 20th Maine Volunteer Infantry Regiment was raised from the Brewer area. The 20th would become one of the most famous units in the Civil War. The regiment saw limited action at Antietam but made up for it at the Battle of Fredericksburg, where they were part of the assault element that aimed to take the Confederate defenses on the high ground. The 20th sustained heavy casualties and was pinned down for over twenty-four hours under enemy fire in the cold December weather. They were positioned on the far left of the Union line at the Battle of Gettysburg in 1863 and sustained multiple enemy attacks until the regiment had nearly run out of ammunition. They had been ordered to hold to the last man. The regimental commander, Colonel Joshua L. Chamberlain then gave the order, “Bayonet, Forward!” knowing that he could not withdraw or the enemy would outflank the Union army. The bayonet charge by the Mainers took the Confederates by surprise and ended their attacks entirely. For his actions, Colonel Chamberlain was awarded the Medal of Honor. The 20th would serve until the end of the war, fighting with distinction in the savage battles through Virginia, such as the Wilderness, Spotsylvania, and Petersburg. The 133rd Engineer Battalion carries on the lineage and traditions of the 20th Maine.

1865-1940
At the end of the war, the Soldiers came home and returned to their civilian lives. Many kept up their military experience by membership in the 1st Maine Volunteer Militia, organised in 1873. The 1st M.V.M. had companies in Portland, Augusta, Skowhegan, Auburn, Norway, Bangor, Belfast, Hampden, and Old Town, laying out the footprint for the future 133rd Engineer Battalion. In 1893, the Maine Volunteer Militia was re-designated as the Maine National Guard, and the 1st M.V.M. was designated the 1st Maine Infantry. The 2nd Maine Infantry was also brought under the Maine National Guard when it was formed from the Maine Volunteer Militia in 1893.

In May 1898 the 1st Maine Infantry was mobilised as the 1st Maine Volunteer Infantry for service in the Spanish–American War. It served stateside and was mustered out of service on 13 December 1898.

In 1909, the 1st M.V.M. reorganised and re-designated as the Coast Artillery Corps, with batteries from Bath to Kittery. In 1917 it was mobilised to protect the Maine coast, manning coast defences, primarily near Portland. In December 1917 four companies were attached to the 54th Artillery (Coast Artillery Corps) and deployed to France, where they fought on the Marne and the Meuse-Argonne Campaigns. The remaining companies remained in Maine until they were demobilised in December 1918.

The 2nd Maine Infantry was called into service in 1916 for service on the Texas border and then again in 1917 for World War I where it was combined with a unit from New Hampshire to become the 103rd U.S. Infantry, which was one of the four Infantry regiments in the 26th Division (a.k.a. the "Yankee Division"). They served on the front lines in France, taking part in the battles of Champagne-Marne, Aisne-Marne, Saint-Mihiel, Meuse-Argonne, Ile de France, and Lorraine. One soldier, Private First Class George Dilboy, was posthumously awarded the Medal of Honor for his actions in single-handedly overrunning a German machine gun position.

The 103d Infantry was demobilized in April 1919 and was reassigned to the 43rd Infantry Division when it was formed in the early 1920s.

In 1922 the Coast Artillery units were re-designated as the 1st Coast Defense Command, and re-designated again on 17 September 1923 as the 240th Coast Artillery Regiment.

World War II
As the United States prepared to enter World War II, the 240th Coast Artillery was mobilized to defend Portland on September 16, 1940. On 7 October 1944, the regiment was re-organized into the 185th and 186th Coast Artillery Battalions. On 1 April 1945, the two battalions were consolidated into the Harbor Defenses of Portland, which was inactivated in June 1946.

During World War II, the 103rd Infantry, as an element of the 43rd Infantry Division, served in the Pacific theater, fighting in the battles of Guadalcanal, North Solomons, New Guinea, and Luzon, helping General Macarthur liberate the Philippines. They were the first unit to reach the Ipo Dam, which controlled the water supply for Manila, a crucial step in liberating the city.

Post WWII 
In February 1947, the Coast Artillery units were re-organized and re-designated as the 703rd Anti-Aircraft Gun Battalion. They were mobilized from August 1950 to April 1952 to replace Regular Army units that had deployed to Korea during the Korean War.

On 1 March 1959 Companies A, B, and C of the 703rd AA Bn consolidated with the 103d Infantry and were reorganized and re-designated as the 103d Armored Cavalry Regiment (ACR). Meanwhile, Headquarters and Company D of the 703rd AA Gun Bn were re-organized and re-designated, and consolidated with the 314th Anti-Aircraft Artillery Battalion to form 1st Battalion, 240th Artillery. On 1 June 1961 the 103d ACR, less the headquarters company, was reorganized and re-designated as the 20th Armor Regiment. At the same time, the Headquarters Company of the 103rd ACR was re-designated as Headquarters, 113th Armor Group.

The 240th Artillery was converted, reorganized, and re-designated on 1 June 1961 as the 262d Engineer Battalion with headquarters at Bangor.

In 1962, the 3d Battalion, 20th Armor was mobilized for the Berlin Crisis and stood ready in Fort Stewart, Georgia, until the crisis defused. In 1963, the 1st Battalion, 20th Armor was stood up in readiness during the Cuban Missile Crisis but the issues were resolved before the unit had to deploy. The 240th Coast Artillery served until the 1960s before being disbanded, but its lineage was assumed into the 20th Armor.

On 31 December 1967 the 20th Armor consolidated with Headquarters, 113th Armor Group to form the 133d Engineer Battalion.

On 1 September 1993 the 133rd Engineer Battalion was consolidated with the 262nd Engineer Battalion while retaining its designation as the 133rd Engineer Battalion.

133d Engineer Battalion
Since 1970, 133d Engineer Battalion has served both at home for disaster relief missions and abroad in defense of the nation. In 1992 the battalion deployed to Panama to improve infrastructure in rural areas. In 1994, the battalion functioned as Mission Command in support of New Horizons, Task Force Dirigo, in Guatemala, a humanitarian and disaster relief mission. In 1997, units of the 133rd were deployed to Bosnia-Herzegovina in support of Operation Joint Guard.

After 9/11, the 133d was mobilized in support of Operation Iraqi Freedom II between 2004 and 2005. The battalion served as the Engineer Task Force for I Corps’ Task Force Olympia in the Multi-National Brigade-Northwest Area of Operations. As a battalion, the 133d completed over 730 troop missions, completed host-nation improvements in excess of 15 million dollars, built over 12 kilometers of earthen berms for force protection, and completed 15 airfield assistance missions. In addition, the 133d completed 84 humanitarian assistance missions, donating 1473 boxes of school supplies, clothes, shoes, food, and toys to Iraqi communities as well as building roads, wells and multiple schools and medical clinics. The 133d Engineer Battalion's area of operations (AO) spanned an area the size of the U.S. northeast, significantly larger than most Engineer battalion's normal span of control in Iraq. The 133d was awarded the Meritorious Unit Commendation for their participation in the Transition of Iraq and Iraqi Governance Campaigns.

In 2005, members of the 133d responded to Louisiana to provide security and disaster relief assistance after Hurricane Katrina.  Similarly, the 133d sent Joint Task Force Maine to Vermont in 2011 to assist in Tropical Storm Irene recovery. The 133d opened several key routes in Vermont that had been closed to debris or washouts, enabling communities to get assistance.

Following Hurricane Irene in 2011, a task force of vertical and horizontal Engineers from the 133rd assisted communities in Vermont in their recovery efforts.

Following Superstorm Sandy in 2012, a task force of vertical and horizontal Engineers from the 133rd assisted communities in Connecticut in their recovery efforts.

In the spring of 2013, the 133d deployed a company of vertical engineers to El Salvador to assist in critical infrastructure repairs in support of Operation Beyond the Horizon.

On 10 August 2013, the 133d was mobilized in Support of Operation Enduring Freedom, Afghanistan.

An article in the Portland Press Herald dated April 30, 2014 stated the 133d Engineer Battalion is under consideration for transfer to Pennsylvania and replacement in-state by an infantry battalion. These plans were declared shelved in November 2015.

Organization 

The unit is composed of:
 Headquarters and Headquarters Company, Brunswick, Maine
 Forward Support Company, Brunswick, Maine
 136th Engineer Company (Vertical), Skowhegan, Maine
 185th Engineer Company (Engineer Support), Caribou, Maine
 251st Engineer Company (Sapper), Norway, Maine
 262nd Engineer Company (Horizontal), Westbrook, Maine

Honors 

Meritorious Unit Commendation for Operation Iraqi Freedom
Meritorious Unit Commendation for Operation Enduring Freedom

Notes

References 
 Our Proud Military History. Maine National Guard
 133rd Engineer Battalion. Maine National Guard
 Lineage and Honors of the 133rd Engineer Battalion
  History of the 103rd Infantry Regiment. By SSG Esther Kazian, Veterans of Foreign Wars, Norman N. Dow - Isaac E. Clewley Post 1761. Originally published in The Patriot News, The Newsletter of the Maine Military Historical Society, Volume 1, Issue 3, January 2011
 https://web.archive.org/web/20131230222819/http://103rd.newspipers.com/
 

 Pearson 1913, p. 243; and personal communication, Col. Leonid Kondratiuk, Director, Historical Services, Adjutant General's Office, MA.
 

Engineer battalions of the United States Army
Battalions of the United States Army National Guard
Military units and formations in Maine
1803 establishments in Maine
Military units and formations established in 1803